"Thank You" is a song by English singer Jamelia. It was written by Jamelia, Peter Biker and Carsten "Soulshock" Schack, while production was helmed by the latter two. The song was chosen as the third single taken from Jamelia's second studio album, Thank You (2003). "Thank You" is about an abusive relationship, of which Jamelia had first-hand experience, discussing that relationship and how she made it through the experience.

"Thank You", released in the United Kingdom on 23 February 2004, became Jamelia's highest-charting single in the UK to date, peaking at number two and spending 14 weeks within the UK Singles Chart. It was kept off the top spot by a re-release of Peter Andre's "Mysterious Girl." The song was also successful in Australia, New Zealand, Finland, and Ireland, peaking inside the top 20 in all four countries. In France, the song was released as a duet with French singer Singuila, reaching number 30 on the French Single Chart.

Music video
Many critics saw the song as a source of strength and inspiration, which is why in the music video, directed by Matthew Rolston, Jamelia is depicted as the four elements. She commented that when thinking of ideas for the music video she wanted to focus on the positive side of the song, not the negative.

Track listings

Personnel
Personnel are lifted from the Thank You album booklet.
 Jamelia – writing (as Jamelia Davis)
 Soulshock – writing (as Carsten Schack), all instruments, production, mixing, arrangement
 Peter Biker – writing, all instruments, production, arrangement
 Eric Jackson – guitar

Charts

Weekly charts

Year-end charts

Certifications

Release history

References

2003 songs
2004 singles
Jamelia songs
Male–female vocal duets
Parlophone singles
Song recordings produced by Soulshock and Karlin
Songs about domestic violence
Songs written by Jamelia
Songs written by Soulshock